Levico Terme (Levego in local dialect) is a comune (municipality) in Trentino in the northern Italian region Trentino-Alto Adige/Südtirol, located about  southeast of Trento.

Geography

The city is dominated by the mountains of the Lagorai range on the north, with Monte Fronte, elevation , and Monte Panarotta, and the zone of the Plateaus (Vezzena, Lavarone, Luserna, Folgaria) on the south, where Cima Vezzena, also locally called Pizzo di Levico , with its distinctive Austro-Hungarian fort on its top, and Cima Pegolara are located. To the west the Vigolana range can be seen past the lakes of Levico and Caldonazzo, and on the east the valley opens considerably, and the view extends beyond Borgo Valsugana.

The urbanised area is predominantly on the valley floor, with the main urban centre lying on the left side of the river Brenta along with the frazioni of Selva and Campiello, while on the right of the river lie the 'frazioni' of Barco, Santa Giuliana and Quaere. Other hamlets do not lie on the valley floor, though their population is low and often tied to seasonal activities such as tourism (Vetriolo Terme) or mountain activities such as logging, grazing and recreation (Passo Vezzena).

The municipality of Levico Terme is traditionally divided into six rioni (quarters): Chiesa (north-west), Furo (north-east), Grande (south-west) and Cortina (south-east) in the main urban centre, Oltrebrenta comprising all the frazioni on the right bank of the Brenta (Barco, Santa Giuliana, Quaere), and Selva comprising the village of the same name and Campiello.

West of the city, above Lake Levico, lies Forte Col De Le Bene, an Austro-Hungarian fort, also known as Forte San Biagio, from the name of the hill it is built on.

History

Ancient history
Traces of inhabitants in the Levico area can be dated back to the Iron Age, though the first organised settlement springs up during the Roman era.
The etymology of the name "Levico" is still debated. The Latin interpretations are the ones most agreed with, given the abundance of Latin terms in the topography of the municipality (such as Furo, from forum).

Bishopric of Trent
In 1027, the territory of Levico passed under the Bishopric of Trent, established with Conrad II's donation to Bishop Ulrich II. However, Levico remained under the Diocese of Feltre regarding spiritual authority, and would remain that way until 1785.
The name Levico (as Levigo) appears for the first time in a document dated 29 October 1184, in a papal bull in which Pope Lucius III reaffirms the rights of the Diocese of Feltre in Valsugana.

Levico followed the history of the Bishopric, and, as communitas Levigi, proclaimed its statute in 1431 and 1479. During the German Peasants' War, in August 1525, peasants from the Valsugana marched towards Trento against the then-Bishop's Captain; the rebellion, however, was rapidly crushed. In 1575 and 1636 Levico was ravaged by plague epidemics; the latter cut the population in half.

In the 18th century, scientific journals spread news about the health effects of the local waters, rich in arsenic and iron, which were mentioned in Michelangelo Mariani's History of the Council of Trent in 1673. The first spa building taking advantage of these springs was opened in 1860.

The Austrian period to the present day

In 1779, through a treaty between Austria and the Bishopric of Trent, the jurisdiction of Levico passed to the House of Habsburg.

Napoleon I, on his way to the battle of Bassano in September 1796, after reaching Trento passed through the Valsugana, encountering a light Austrian resistance in Levico, which was then defined by Napoleon loco ameno et hospitale (quaint and hospitable town). Afterwards, Levico would follow the rest of Trentino in its annexation to Austria, after the abolition of the Bishopric as a political entity in 1803.
The Third Italian War of Independence saw a battle between Austrian and Italian troops, during the latter's advance towards Trento, fought in town through the night of 23-24 July 1866. In 1894 Levico was elevated to the rank of city (Stadtgemeinde), by Imperial-Royal Decree, under Franz Joseph I of Austria, and in 1896 it was reached by the Valsugana railway.

At the outbreak of World War I Levico was still part of Austria-Hungary, and as such it supplied a contingent of soldiers (The 1st Kaiserjäger Regiment had a battalion stationed in the city). The civilian population, though, was mostly deported to internment camps (Internierungslager) in the heartland of the Empire when Italy joined the Entente on 24 May 1915. The city lay indeed right next to the frontline of the plateaus to the south, and most of the population ended up in camps in Moravia, in the so-called wooden cities. Those that, mostly for being suspected of holding pro-Italian positions, were deemed to pose a security risk were instead interned in Katzenau, in harsh conditions.

The peace treaty assigned Levico, along with the rest of Trentino and South Tyrol, to Italy. The city had been devastated by abandonment and the long absence of workers, and reconstruction was slow. In order to hasten the rebuilding, the massive Austro-Hungarian forts that had been employed during the war were scavenged for scrap iron and building material, making most of these forts little more than ruins.

World War II touched Levico, along with the rest of the province, only to a limited extent until the Badoglio Proclamation on 8 September 1943, when it was invaded by the Wehrmacht and incorporated to the Alpenvorland under direct German administration.
Levico was bombed many times throughout the second part of the war; the largest bombing, on 15 March 1945 destroyed the spa building and the Regina hotel, at the time one of the most luxurious hotels in the region.

After the war, Levico saw a large urbanistic expansion and the rebuilding of the spa complex (opened in 1965), developing the existing tourism-based economy even more. As tourist destination Levico Terme is mainly geared towards senior citizens and families with small children. Thermal treatments, biking and excursions in the area are possible. Around 50 restaurants and 30 accommodation facilities are available to guests.

Demographic evolution

Twin towns
Levico Terme is twinned with:

  Hausham, Germany, since 1959

References

External links

 Comune di Levico Terme Homepage of the city

Cities and towns in Trentino-Alto Adige/Südtirol